Albania is a historic house located on U.S. 17 in Edenton, Chowan County, North Carolina. It is locally significant as an imposing Greek Revival house, built by Edward Warren.

Description and history 
It was built about 1857, and is a -story, five bay, "L"-shaped Greek Revival style frame dwelling. It sits on a brick foundation, and has a -story rear wing. The front facade features a full-length two-tiered engaged porch supported by six square-in-section pillars.

It was listed on the National Register of Historic Places on May 13, 1976.

References

Houses on the National Register of Historic Places in North Carolina
Greek Revival houses in North Carolina
Houses completed in 1857
Houses in Chowan County, North Carolina
National Register of Historic Places in Chowan County, North Carolina
1857 establishments in North Carolina